"HEAVEN" is the twenty-seventh single released by the Japanese rock band Buck-Tick, released on December 17, 2008.

Track listing

Musicians

Atsushi Sakurai - Voice
Hisashi Imai - Guitar
Hidehiko Hoshino - Guitar
Yutaka Higuchi - Bass
Toll Yagami - Drums
Kazutoshi Yakoyama - keyboards

References

2008 singles
Buck-Tick songs
2008 songs
BMG Japan singles
Songs with lyrics by Atsushi Sakurai
Songs with music by Hisashi Imai